Cineplex Odeon Films (later known as Odeon Films) was the film distribution unit of the Canadian cinema chain Cineplex Odeon Corporation. The company was originally named Pan-Canadian Film Distributors. In 1998, the company was sold off to Alliance Atlantis Communications, which eventually folded into Entertainment One.

History
The company began in 1979 as Pan-Canadian Film Distributors, a partnership between film producer Garth Drabinsky and inventor Nat Taylor, based in Toronto, Ontario. At the time of its establishment in the United States, the Cineplex Odeon theatre chain and the tie-in studio were owned by the MCA entertainment group, also the then-owners of Universal Pictures. On August 27, 1986, Pan-Canadian renamed itself as Cineplex Odeon Films, and began operations at Los Angeles, California in November 1986; Garth Drabinsky became its chief officer. Cineplex Odeon Films made its first film to American screens, which was The Decline of the American Empire, produced by Rene Malo.

The distribution branch then underwent a restructuring shortly afterwards, in order to turn the company into a U.S.-based subsidiary of the firm, with headquarters in Century City, with regional offices in New York City, Chicago and other markets, and the new Canadian division of the studio would start operating out of the new Cineplex Odeon corporate headquarters in Canada, and the turf included licensing of films on home video, pay TV and theatrical distribution. In late 1987, it formed a partnership with Robert Redford's production company Wildwood Enterprises, Inc. by setting up Northfolk Productions, for combining the production of both pictures with budgets less than $5 million, and has plans to produce at least five films for the next five years between the average budget of $4–5 million. By 1990, it was Canada's largest independent film distribution company.

On October 22, 1987, Cineplex Odeon created yet another subsidiary, that of the television division, Cineplex Odeon Television Productions, which the first project made by Cineplex Odeon was 41 new episodes of the anthology series Alfred Hitchcock Presents, which was set for the USA Network in 1988, in association with MCA TV, and will also be seen in Canada on the Global Television Network, and David J. Patterson became senior vice president of the Cineplex Odeon television division.

In December 1993, it was announced by Michael Herman (Cineplex Odeon Films Canada Senior Vice President of Corporate Affairs) that as part of a corporate restructuring, Bryan Gliserman had been appointed to the role of Senior Vice President of Corporate Affairs effective January 17, 1994. Gliserman would oversee all of Cineplex Odeon Films operations, and would be responsible for the maintenance and improvement of Cineplex Odeon Films distribution services. Gliserman would also build relationships with key suppliers like Columbia/Tri-Star, Savoy Pictures and Gramercy Pictures. Prior to his promotion, Gliserman had spent 17 years in the Canadian film industry. He had experience with development, financing, production, distribution and exhibition posts with a wide variety of organization.

Later in the 1990s, it changed its name to Odeon Films on account of its historic significance, before releasing one of their final films—the science-fiction film Cube (released in American markets under Trimark Pictures' banner).

The remaining 25% was donated to a foundation representing Canada's film schools. The sale took place as Cineplex Odeon Corporation was sold to Sony's Loews Theaters to form Loews Cineplex Entertainment. The sale was partly due to a Canadian law that forbids foreign companies from owning domestic distributors as the company was no longer Canadian.

The Cineplex Odeon Films library is currently owned by Echo Bridge Entertainment (who acquired Alliance Atlantis' international distribution unit in 2008) and AMC Theatres. As a side note, in 2013, Alliance Films, the company that succeeded Alliance Atlantis Communications, was folded into Entertainment One.

Film history
Notable films from Cineplex Odeon's early days include The Glass Menagerie, The Last Temptation of Christ, Prancer, The Grifters, Mr. and Mrs. Bridge, Madame Sousatzka, Jacknife, the Prince concert film Sign o' the Times, The Decline of the American Empire, Oliver Stone's Talk Radio, and The Care Bears Adventure in Wonderland.

A home video division was also started in 1986, previously known as Pan-Canadian Video Presentations in the early 80s. The company also had a home video deal with Universal with most titles released through their MCA Video banner in the US and Canada. The home video division lasted until 1998, when it was absorbed into Alliance Atlantis along with its film distribution counterpart. The company received a deal with Virgin Vision in 1987 for the Canadian distribution of the output.

Cineplex Odeon worked with Universal for distributing and co-producing some of their notable productions in the US, such  as The Glass Menagerie, The Last Temptation of Christ, Oliver Stone's Talk Radio, and Madame Sousatzka. The company also had a home video deal with Universal with most titles released through their MCA Home Video (later Universal Studios Home Video) banner. Cineplex Odeon also had an international division, Cineplex Odeon Films International, meant for distributing their films outside of North America.

References

External links
A biography of the company's founder, Garth Drabinsky

Film distributors of Canada
Defunct mass media companies of the United States
Mass media companies established in 1978
Defunct mass media companies of Canada
Loews Cineplex Entertainment
1978 establishments in Ontario
1998 disestablishments in Ontario